Randall Lee Van Divier (born June 5, 1958) is a former American football offensive lineman. Van Divier, who played at Anaheim High School, was a captain for the 1980 Pac-10 champion Washington Huskies, and was later selected by the Baltimore Colts as the 68th overall pick in the third round of the 1981 NFL Draft. After playing in 16 games with one start, Van Divier was cut by the Colts prior to the 1982 NFL season. Van Divier then signed with the Los Angeles Raiders but did not see action during the season. In 1983, he was cut by the Raiders at the end of training camp, and went on to play for the Oakland Invaders of the United States Football League (USFL) during the league's 1984 season. Following the season, he was signed and released by both the New Jersey Generals and the Portland Breakers prior to the 1985 USFL season but did not play for either team. He was re-signed by the Los Angeles Raiders but suffered a broken leg during a 1985 preseason game and was placed on season-ending injured reserve. Van Divier returned in 1986 but was waived during training camp prior to the regular season.

External links
NFL.com player page

1958 births
Living people
Players of American football from Anaheim, California
American football offensive tackles
American football offensive guards
Washington Huskies football players
Baltimore Colts players
Los Angeles Raiders players
Oakland Invaders players
Boston/New Orleans/Portland Breakers players